Adam of Balsham ( or ) (c. 1100/1102 – c. 1157/1169) was an Anglo-Norman scholastic and churchman.

Life
Adam was born in Balsham, near Cambridge, England. He studied with Peter Lombard at the University of Paris. He later taught at Paris; among his pupils were John of Salisbury and William of Tyre and might have been a contemporary there of Rainald of Dassel (c. 1120 – 14 August 1167). Gabriel Nuchelmans surmises that he may have been the first person to introduce the term enuntiabile, which came to be used in the same sense as dictum.

Many sources have assumed Adam of Balsham and Adam, Bishop of St Asaph (or Adam the Welshman) to be the same person, although Raymond Klibansky concludes that they were two different men.

The Petit-Pont attached to Adam's name and which crosses the Seine linking the west front of Notre-Dame Cathedral in Paris (and the site of a former bishop's palace) to the Left Bank St Michel area would have been the main centre of Adam's intellectual group (it was renamed in 2013 with the addition of the name of Cardinal Lustiger: 'Petit-Pont Cardinal Lustiger').

Works
 Lorenzo Minio-Paluello (ed.), Twelfth Century Logic: Texts and Studies. Vol. I:Adam balsamiensis parvipontani. Ars disserendi (Dialectica Alexandri), Rome: Edizioni di Storia e Letteratura, 1956.
 De utensilibus, (or Fale tolum) on rare words.

Notes

Further reading
 Peter Dronke (ed.), A History of Twelfth-Century Western Philosophy, Cambridge: Cambridge University Press, 1988.
 Gabriel Nuchelmans, Theories of the Proposition: Ancient and Medieval Conceptions of the Bearers of Truth and Falsity, Amsterdam: North-Holland, 1973.
 
 Yukio Iwakuma, Sten Ebbesen, Logico-Theological Schools from the Second Half of the Twelfth Century: A List of Sources, Vivarium 30, 1992, 173–210.

External links

1100s births
12th-century deaths
English logicians
English non-fiction writers
Catholic philosophers
Scholastic philosophers
English philosophers
English male non-fiction writers
People from Balsham
12th-century English writers
Anglo-Normans
12th-century Latin writers